WordGirl (stylized as W✪RD GIRL) is an American children's Flash animated superhero television series produced by the Soup2Nuts animation unit of Scholastic Entertainment for PBS Kids. The series began as a series of shorts entitled The Amazing Colossal Adventures of WordGirl that premiered on PBS Kids Go! on November 10, 2006, usually shown at the end of Maya & Miguel; the segment was then spun off into a new thirty-minute episodic series that premiered on September 3, 2007 on most PBS member stations. The series of shorts consisted of thirty episodes, with 130 episodes in the full half-hour series.

WordGirl creator Dorothea Gillim felt that most children's animation "underestimated [children's] sense of humor" and hoped to create a more intellectual show for young audiences.

By June 2014, many PBS stations had stopped airing WordGirl, opting to air more popular series throughout the summer. However, new episodes continued to air on select stations, with streaming options on the PBS Kids website and video app. The series ended with the two-part episode "Rhyme and Reason", which was released on August 7, 2015.

The show was created for children ages 4–9. By 2022, the show had gained a cult following through social media.

Background
WordGirl began in 2006 as a series of shorts airing immediately after Maya & Miguel, becoming an independent show in September 2007.

The show's creator, Dorothea Gillim, believes that children's shows often underestimate children's intelligence:

Gillim says she created the show, in part, with the idea that parents would watch the show with their children to support their learning.

Each eleven-minute segment in each episode (except for the first three episodes) begins with verbal instructions to listen for two words that will be used throughout the plot of that episode. The words (examples include “diversion,” “cumbersome,” and “idolize”) are chosen according to academic guidelines. The reasoning is that children can understand words like “cumbersome” when told that it means “big and heavy and awkward.”

PBS NewsHour anchor Jim Lehrer agreed to do a mock interview with WordGirl. Jack D. Ferraiolo, who developed the series with Gillim and served as the series' head writer in Season One, received an Emmy for his work on WordGirl.

Rather than hiring writers experienced with children's television, the show's original writers' previous credits included The Onion and Family Guy. Narrator Chris Parnell had previously worked on Saturday Night Live.

Synopsis
The series follows WordGirl, a girl with superpowers whose secret identity is Becky Botsford, a student. WordGirl was born on the fictional planet Lexicon (also a term referring to the vocabulary of a language or to a dictionary) but was sent away after sneaking onto a spaceship and sleeping there. Captain Huggy Face, a chimpanzee who was a pilot in the Lexicon Air Force, piloted the ship, but lost control when WordGirl awoke, and crash-landed on Earth (more specifically in Fair City), a planet that affords WordGirl her superpowers, including flight and super strength. WordGirl utilizes these powers to save her adoptive home, using her downed spacecraft as a secret base of operations. 

WordGirl was adopted and provided an alter ego by Tim and Sally Botsford, who gave her the name Becky. While in her alter ego, she has a younger brother, TJ, obsessed with WordGirl, but still unknowingly a typical sibling rival to Becky. The Botsford family keeps Captain Huggy Face as a pet, naming him Bob. Becky attends Woodview Elementary School, where she is close friends with Violet Heaslip and the school newspaper reporter Todd “Scoops” Ming. 

WordGirl tries to balance her superhero activities with her "normal" life. She battles against an assortment of villains that include but are not limited to The Butcher, Chuck the Evil Sandwich Making Guy, Dr. Two-Brains, Granny May, Mr. Big, Tobey McCalister III, and Whammer. The villains are all prone to malapropisms. At the same time, she must worry about maintaining her second life as Becky, keeping people from discovering the truth and living normal family situations.

Format
Often, short animated segments are shown in between and at the end of episodes. "What's Your Favorite Word?", ostensibly hosted by Todd "Scoops" Ming, is a series of vox populi interviews asking random children what their favorite words are and why. A short game show segment called "May I Have a Word?" (stylized as MAYIHAVEAWORD in the text bubble on Beau Handsome's wall) airs following each eleven-minute segment. This segment features the game show host, Beau Handsome, asking three contestants the definition of a particular word. The segment was created by Kelly Miyahara, Barry Sonnenfeld, and Ryan Raddatz.

Yet another segment features the interstitials announcer (Rodger Parsons) asking Captain Huggy Face for a visual demonstration of a certain word (such as "strenuous" or "flummoxed"). When Captain Huggy Face correctly demonstrates the meaning of the word, a definition is given, followed by a victory dance by the chimpanzee sidekick.

During the four-part episode, "The Rise of Miss Power", a four-segment "Pretty Princess Power Hour" sketch is shown between acts, filling in for the average two-segment "May I Have a Word?" sketch, presumably to fill the double-length (52 minutes) time slot.

Companion website
The companion site to WordGirl lives on PBS Kids, and was built by interactive firm Big Bad Tomato. It contains vocabulary-building games, a section where children can submit their favorite word, a video page with clips from the show (only available in the US due to legal reasons), a "Heroes and Villains" section with character biographies and activities, and a PBS Parents section with episode guides, lessons, a site map, and more activities to play at home. As of April 2022, the website is still active.

Voice cast

Comics
A series of WordGirl comics were also released by Boom! Studios new KaBOOM! line. The names of the volumes and the stories within them are:

 Coalition of Malice
 Coalition of Malice - 
 Super Fans -
 Incredible Shrinking Allowance
 The Incredible Shrinking Allowance - 
 Fondue, Fondon't -
 Word Up!
 The Ham Van Makes the Man - 
 Think Big -
 Fashion Disaster
 Fashion Disaster - 
 Fort Wham-Ground -

Series overview

Awards
The show has received seven Daytime Emmy nominations, winning four for "Outstanding Writing in Animation" in 2008, 2012–2013 and Outstanding Writing in an Animated Program in 2015.

2008:
2008 Television Critics Association Award for Outstanding Achievement in Youth Programming, awarded July 19
2008 Daytime Emmy for Outstanding Writing in Animation

2009:
Learning Magazine 2009 Teacher's Choice Award for Families
2009 iParenting Media Award
Featured at the KIDS FIRST! Film Festival 2009
NY Festivals' 2009 TV Programming and Promotions award

2012:
2012 Daytime Emmy for Outstanding Writing in Animation

2013:
2013 Daytime Emmy for Outstanding Writing in Animation

2015:
2015: Daytime Emmy for Outstanding Writing in an Animated Program

Reception and legacy

The series was positively received. Emily Ashby of Common Sense Media described the series as having a "brainy heroine [who] uses vocab to outwit bad guys." She also called it an "entertaining animated series" with some cartoon violence and said that it is an "excellent...choice for young grade-schoolers."

In 2022, Collider attested that the "non-white, little girl superhero" protagonist of WordGirl began a superhero trend. The article attests that the generation who grew up watching WordGirl later demanded new and diverse Marvel heroes, such as Captain Marvel.

References

External links
 
 WordGirl at Super3 
 

 
2000s American animated television series
2007 American television series debuts
2010s American animated television series
2015 American television series endings
American children's animated action television series
American children's animated adventure television series
American children's animated comic science fiction television series
American children's animated education television series
American children's animated superhero television series
American flash animated television series
Animated superheroine television shows
Animated television series about children
Animated television series about monkeys
Animated television series about families
Boom! Studios titles
Child superheroes
Elementary school television series
English-language education television programming
PBS Kids shows
PBS original programming
Reading and literacy television series
Television series by Soup2Nuts